Faruk Kulenović (born 23 February 1952 in Zagreb, Croatia, FPR Yugoslavia) is a Croatian-Bosnian professional basketball coach. When he coached KK Šibenik, Dražen Petrović was a youngster at the club.

Career
as a player
1963-1973 HAKK Mladost
as a coach
1973-1978 Medveščak
1979-1981 Borovo
1981-1982 Šibenik
1982-1985 Kvarner
1985-1987 Pula
1988 Hapoel Jerusalem
1989 KK Šibenik
1990-1993 Alba Berlin
1993-1994 Fenerbahçe
1994-1995 National team of Bosnia and Herzegovina
1995-1996 Zrinjevac
1996-1999 Slavonski Brod
1999-2000 Zrinjevac
2000-2001 Ohud Medina
2005-2006 Darüşşafaka Doğuş Youth Team
2008-2009 İstanbul Teknik Üniversitesi Youth Team

References

External links 
Profile@htnet.hr

1952 births
Living people
Basketball players from Zagreb
Yugoslav men's basketball players
Croatian men's basketball players
Yugoslav basketball coaches
Croatian basketball coaches
Basketball coaches of international teams
Fenerbahçe basketball coaches
KK Šibenik coaches

Bosniaks of Croatia